Halanaerobacter salinarius is a halophilic fermentative bacterium from the genus of Halanaerobacter.

References

Clostridia
Bacteria described in 1999